Discovery Glacier is a broad glacier,  long, between Hurricane Ridge and Mount Discovery on the Scott Coast, Victoria Land. The glacier flows north to coalesce with the eastern margin of lower Koettlitz Glacier. It was named by the Advisory Committee on Antarctic Names (1999) in association with Mount Discovery, which Captain Robert Falcon Scott had named after the expedition ship of the British National Antarctic Expedition, 1901–04.

References 

Glaciers of Victoria Land
Scott Coast